Alcock and Gander is a British sitcom that aired on ITV in 1972. Starring Beryl Reid and Richard O'Sullivan, it lasted for one series. It was written by Johnnie Mortimer and Brian Cooke, who later
wrote Man About the House, where O'Sullivan was the lead male character. It was made for the ITV network by Thames Television.

Cast
Beryl Reid as Mrs Marigold Alcock
Richard O'Sullivan as Richard Gander
John Cater as Ernest
Julie Martin as Collette

Plot
The series starts as Marigold Alcock inherits her husband's business The Alcock Group of Companies upon his death. The companies, whose headquarters are above a strip club in Soho, include Sotheby's Racing Service Ltd and Hugh Blanding's Detective Agency. The elderly Ernest is her office assistant, while her partner is Richard Gander. He was given  partnership in the company after an Alcock Economy Coach Tour went wrong.

Episodes
The Safe Breaker (5 June 1972)
Husband In A Hurry (12 June 1972)
Soho Is Too Small (19 June 1972)
Pontoon (26 June 1972)
The Strip Club (3 July 1972)
Artistic Books, Soho, Ltd (10 July 1972)

DVD release
The Complete Series of Alcock and Gander was released by Network DVD in the UK (Region 2) on 26 November 2012.

References
Mark Lewisohn, "Radio Times Guide to TV Comedy", BBC Worldwide Ltd, 2003
British TV Comedy Guide for Alcock and Gander

External links

1972 British television series debuts
1972 British television series endings
1970s British sitcoms
ITV sitcoms
Television shows produced by Thames Television
Television series by Fremantle (company)
English-language television shows
Television shows shot at Teddington Studios